The 1964 Maryland Terrapins football team represented the University of Maryland in the 1964 NCAA University Division football season. In their sixth season under head coach Tom Nugent, the Terrapins compiled a 5–5 record (4–3 in conference), finished in a tie for third place in the Atlantic Coast Conference, and outscored their opponents 164 to 126. The team's statistical leaders included Phil Petry with 809 passing yards, Tom Hickey with 894 rushing yards, and Dick Absher with 268 receiving yards.

Schedule

References

Maryland
Maryland Terrapins football seasons
Maryland Terrapins football